Isopropyl methoxypyrazine (IPMP) is a methoxypyrazine, a class of chemical compounds that produce odors.  The odor is rather undesirable and is produced by the Asian lady beetle or by the actinomycete Streptomyces sp. It can be detected by human taste at concentrations of as low as 2 nanograms per litre.

Presence in wine grapes 
The odor of IPMP tends to be undesirable in the case of certain wines.

Cabernet Sauvignon has high levels of methoxypyrazines. Two methoxypyrazine compounds, 3-isobutyl-2-methoxypyrazine (IBMP) and 3-isopropyl-2-methoxypyrazine, are  considered to be important determinants of green flavours in Sauvignon blanc wines.

Presence in coffee 
IPMP is also an important flavour compound in coffee and is responsible for causing an off-taste called "potato taste" in East African coffee. The insects Antestiopsis are also implicated in causing the taste.

See also 
 Alkylpyrazines

References 

Pyrazines
Isopropyl compounds
Foul-smelling chemicals